The Lynx Gang (sometimes known as The Lynx Crew) was a Birmingham-based gang originally of British Pakistani members that was founded in the 1970s, initially to protect the British Pakistani community (most notably of Mirpuri), from White power skinheads. Later, the gang transformed into a violent criminal gang. It was involved in several criminal attacks in Birmingham.

The gang was founded in the Sparkhill area of the city, but later spread to the Birmingham boroughs Lozells, Handsworth, Birmingham, Sparkbrook, and Aston.
Moazzem Begg is a former member of the gang.

References 

Street gangs
Prison gangs
Gangs in Birmingham, West Midlands
Pakistani-British gangs